General MacDonell may refer to:

Archibald Cameron Macdonell (1864–1941), Canadian Army lieutenant general
Archibald Hayes Macdonell (1868–1939), Canadian Army brigadier general
James Macdonell (British Army officer) (1781–1857), British Army general

See also
Attorney General McDonell (disambiguation)